Patalillo is a district of the Vázquez de Coronado canton, in the San José province of Costa Rica.

History 
Patalillo was created on 11 January 1968 by Decreto Ejecutivo 03. Segregated from Dulce Nombre de Jesús.

Geography 
Patalillo has an area of  km² and an elevation of  metres.

Demographics 

For the 2011 census, Patalillo had a population of  inhabitants.

Transportation

Road transportation 
The district is covered by the following road routes:
 National Route 102
 National Route 220

References 

Districts of San José Province
Populated places in San José Province